The Long Island City Post Office is a historic post office building located at Long Island City in Queens County, New York, United States. It was built in 1928, and is one of a number of post offices in New York designed by the Office of the Supervising Architect under director James A. Wetmore.  The building is a two-story, symmetrically massed brick building with limestone trim in the Colonial Revival style.  It features a frontispiece with four semi-engaged limestone Ionic order columns that support a pedimented entablature.

It was listed on the National Register of Historic Places in 1989.

References

Long Island City
Government buildings completed in 1928
Colonial Revival architecture in New York City
Government buildings in Queens, New York
Long Island City
1928 establishments in New York City
National Register of Historic Places in Queens, New York